Novokilbakhtino (Yañı Kilbaqtı) is a rural locality (a village) in Novokilbakhtinsky Selsoviet, Kaltasinsky District, Bashkortostan, Russia. The population was 360 as of 2010. There are 11 streets.

Geography 
Novokilbakhtino is located 26 km east of Kaltasy (the district's administrative centre) by road. Staroturayevo is the nearest rural locality.

References 

Rural localities in Kaltasinsky District